Welcome to the Party may refer to:
"Welcome to the Party" (Diplo, French Montana and Lil Pump song), a 2018 song from Deadpool 2
"Welcome to the Party" (Pop Smoke song), 2019
"Welcome to the Party", a song by PartyNextDoor from PartyNextDoor
"Welcome to the Party", a song by Anna Vissi from Nylon

See also
"Welcome 2 the Party (Ode 2 the Old School)", a song by Kid Rock from Devil Without a Cause